The 1941 Santa Clara Broncos football team represented Santa Clara University as an independent during the 1941 college football season. In its sixth season under head coach Buck Shaw, the team compiled a 6–3 record and outscored opponents by a total of 170 to 103.

After winning its first four games, including shutout victories over California and Michigan State, Santa Clara rose to No. 8 in the AP Poll released on October 20. The team then fell from the rankings, losing three consecutive games against Oklahoma, Stanford, and Oregon. The team rebounded with victories over UCLA and rival Saint Mary's to conclude the season.

Schedule

References

Santa Clara
Santa Clara Broncos football seasons
Santa Clara Broncos football